Athrips bidzilyai is a moth of the family Gelechiidae. It is found in Russia (the southern Ural and southern Buryatia). The habitat consists of rocky steppe slopes and grassy lowland steppes.

The wingspan is 13–13.5 mm. The ground colour of the forewings is dark greyish with nine distinct blackish spots. The hindwings are dark fuscous. Adults are on wing in the second half of June.

Etymology
The species is named in honour of Dr. Oleksiy Bidzilya.

References

Moths described in 2010
Athrips
Moths of Asia
Moths of Europe